New Omni Bank, N.A. is an FDIC-Insured commercial bank, headquartered in Alhambra, California, United States. It has branch offices in Rowland Heights, California, Alhambra, California, and Arcadia, California.

New Omni Bank, N.A. was originally chartered as "Monterey Park National Bank" in 1980 to serve the influx of Taiwanese immigrants. The original headquarters was in Monterey Park, California, at the time nicknamed "Little Taipei" because of the many Taiwanese immigrants settled in the area.

References

Companies based in Los Angeles County, California
Banks based in California
Banks established in 1979
Privately held companies based in California
Chinese American banks
Chinese-American culture in California
Alhambra, California